John M. Woods  (October 22, 1839 – April 10, 1927) was a Massachusetts businessman and politician who served in both branches of the Massachusetts legislature and as the fourteenth Mayor of Somerville, Massachusetts.

Woods was a delegate to the 1884 Democratic National Convention.

See also
 126th Massachusetts General Court (1905)

Notes

1839 births
1927 deaths
1884 United States presidential election
Members of the Massachusetts House of Representatives
Massachusetts state senators
Mayors of Somerville, Massachusetts